"Baby I'm Yours" is a song co-written and recorded by American country music artist Steve Wariner.  It was released in February 1988 as the first single from the album I Should Be with You.  The song reached #2 on the Billboard Hot Country Singles chart.  The song was written by Wariner and Guy Clark.

Charts

Weekly charts

Year-end charts

References

1988 singles
1988 songs
Steve Wariner songs
Songs written by Guy Clark
Songs written by Steve Wariner
Song recordings produced by Jimmy Bowen
MCA Records singles